The 2012 Mackay Cutters season was the fifth in the club's history. Coached by Anthony Seibold and captained by Grant Rovelli, they competed in the QRL's Intrust Super Cup. The club missed the finals for the second consecutive season, finishing eighth.

Season summary
The Cutters welcomed former NRL players David Milne, Rohan Ahern and Jason Schirnack, and Welsh internationals Andrew Gay and Lee Williams to the club in 2012, as they looked to return to the finals. Unfortunately, despite winning more games than in 2011, success evaded the club once again, as they finished the season in eighth, missing the finals. Captain Grant Rovelli was named the club's Player of the Year, finishing as their top try scorer, and was once again selected for the Queensland Residents, captaining the side.

2012 would be head coach Anthony Seibold's final year at the club, as he joined the Melbourne Storm in 2013 to coach their under-20 side.

Squad List

2012 squad

The following players contracted to the North Queensland Cowboys played for the Cutters in 2012: Javid Bowen, Chris Grevsmuhl, Glenn Hall, Sam Hoare, Dane Hogan, Ben Jones, Tyson Martin, Michael Morgan, Mosese Pangai, Jack Rycen, Jason Taumalolo and Francis Veukiso.

Squad movement

Gains

Losses

Fixtures

Regular season

Statistics

Honours

Club
Player of the Year: Grant Rovelli
Sponsor's Player of the Year: Grant Rovelli
Most Consistent: Jardine Bobongie
Rookie of the Year: Tyson Andrews
Club Person of the Year: Kerri Proctor

References

2012 in Australian rugby league
2012 in rugby league by club
Mackay Cutters